Brian's Time (1985 – April 4, 2013) was an American Thoroughbred racehorse. He was sired by Roberto by breeder Joan Phillips. Brian's Time was a grade one stakes-winning millionaire who is probably most remembered for his win in the Florida Derby and a solid runner-up finish to Dual Classic winner Risen Star in the 1988 Preakness Stakes. He later became a very successful breeding stallion in Japan.

Early career 

Brian's Time was a late bloomer and raced only twice as a two-year-old, breaking his maiden in his second attempt. The Roberto colt placed second at Gulfstream Park in a very strong field of sophomores in an allowance race in the winter of his three-year-old season, so his trainer, John M. Veitch, gave him a shot in the grade two Fountain of Youth Stakes. In that race, he faced stakes winners and colts that had won three to five previous starts. He finished fourth, but came back to race in a grade one Florida Derby against ten other three-year-old colts. He won against stiff competition, including Forty Niner and Notebook. Three weeks after the Florida Derby, Brian's Time placed third in the Jim Beam Stakes at Turfway Park in Florence, Kentucky.

His trainer and his owner, Joan Phillips, were encouraged by his Florida Derby finish and decided to enter him in the 114th Kentucky Derby in 1988. In that race, Brian's Time broke poorly and was badly outrun going into the first turn, being bumped several times in close quarters. He was dead last in the field of 17 and was forced widest of seven around the first turn. Coming out of the far turn at Churchill Downs, Brian's Time closed from seventeenth to sixth. Filly Winning Colors won that day.

Preakness Stakes 

John Veitch could not dismiss his colt and his ability because of the way that he closed strongly at the end of the Derby. He also had three very good excuses as to why he got behind so early (the poor break, being bumped, and going very wide around the turn), so Veitch decided to wheel him back in two weeks into the second jewel of the Triple Crown. The three top finishers of the Derby took most of the public support in the grade one Preakness Stakes at Pimlico Race Course. Brian's Time was a lukewarm 7-1 at post time. Eight colts and the filly broke without any problems. The top two from the Derby, Forty Niner and Winning Colors, shot out to the lead.

Brian's Time sat back in seventh but was much closer than he had been in any other of his prior races. Throughout the backstretch and around the far turn, Forty Niner and Winning Colors remained in front. At the top of the stretch, a menacing Risen Star squeezed by on the rail and turned the Preakness into what looked like a romp. Risen Star finished three lengths in front of Winning Colors and 23 lengths in front of Forty Niner. Under Angel Cordero, Brian's Time closed from seventh to second, making up nine lengths in the last furlong as he passed every other horse except dual classic winner Risen Star, who won by a length. Derby winner Winning Colors held on for third, Private Terms was fourth and Forty Niner faded to seventh in the field of nine.

Later career 

Later that summer, Brian's Time placed third in the Belmont Stakes, won the grade two Jim Dandy Stakes at Saratoga Race Course and finished third in the grade one Travers Stakes, also at Saratoga. Late in the year, he won the grade three Pegasus Handicap run in October at Meadowlands Racetrack in East Rutherford, New Jersey.

At age four, Brian's Time raced five times and managed three third place finishes in the grade two Nassau County Handicap at seven furlongs at Belmont Park, the grade two Bernard Baruch Handicap at 1 1/8 miles on the turf at Saratoga Race Course, and the grade one Ben Ali Handicap at Keeneland.

Retirement 

Brian's Time was retired after the 1989 racing season and was sold to a breeding syndicate in Japan. He was regularly one of the leading sires in that country. His offspring included Narita Brian and Mayano Top Gun both of whom were voted Japanese Horse of the Year, as well as Time Paradox (Japan Cup Dirt), Sunny Brian (Japanese Derby), Tanino Gimlet (Japanese Derby), Silk Justice (Arima Kinen), Dantsu Flame (Takarazuka Kinen), Furioso (Japan Dirt Derby) and Phalaenopsis (Queen Elizabeth II Cup). On April 4, 2013, Brian's Time sustained a fractured femur in a paddock accident and was euthanized, he was 28.

See also
 List of historical horses

References 

1985 racehorse births
2013 racehorse deaths
Racehorses bred in Kentucky
Racehorses trained in the United States
Thoroughbred family 4-r